Alsophila nigrolineata, synonym Cyathea nigrolineata, is a species of tree fern in the family Cyatheaceae. Its trunk is approximately 10 meters tall. It has fronds that are 2 to 3 meters in length and bi- or tripinnate. The fronds are placed in groups of 5 to 8 per whorl. The stipe is scaly. It occurs in Eastern New Guinea forests at about 2000 meters.

References

nigrolineata
Endemic flora of New Guinea